Skippers is an unincorporated community in Greensville County, Virginia, United States. The community is located along US 301 and Virginia Secondary Route 629 east of Exit 4 along Interstate 95. It is also located along the CSX North End Subdivision, and has a wye that crosses US 301 as it runs west to what is today a quarry owned by Vulcan Materials.

Originally an agricultural community, the primary industries are cotton and peanut farming. Since the latter half of the 20th century, it has been a frequent stop for truck drivers and other travelers along Interstate 95 using the numerous truck stops at Exits 4 and 8.

References

Unincorporated communities in Greensville County, Virginia
Unincorporated communities in Virginia